Kolijan Restaq District is a district (bakhsh) in Sari County, Mazandaran Province, Iran. At the 2006 census, its population was 13,143, in 3,809 families.  The District has one city Pain Hular. The District has two rural districts (dehestan): Kolijan Rostaq-e Olya Rural District and Tangeh Soleyman Rural District.

See also 
 Kelarestaq
 Namarestaq

References 

Sari County
Districts of Mazandaran Province